Caroline Wozniacki defeated Simona Halep in the final, 7–6(7–2), 3–6, 6–4 to win the women's singles tennis title at the 2018 Australian Open. She became the first Dane to win a major singles title. With the win, Wozniacki also regained the world No. 1 singles ranking for the first time since 2012. She saved two match points en route to the title, in the second round against Jana Fett; Halep also saved match points to reach the final, saving three against Lauren Davis in the third round and two against Angelique Kerber in the semifinals. It was Halep's third runner-up finish in as many major finals, though she would win the French Open a few months later. In addition to Wozniacki and Halep, Garbiñe Muguruza, Elina Svitolina, Karolína Plíšková and Jeļena Ostapenko were in contention for the world No. 1 ranking.

Serena Williams was the reigning champion, but did not participate this year, stating that she was not fully fit after giving birth in September 2017. As a result, she dropped out of the WTA rankings for the first time since 20 October 1997.

The third round match between Halep and Davis lasted 48 games, tying Chanda Rubin and Arantxa Sánchez Vicario's 1996 quarterfinal match for the Australian Open's record for most games played in a women's match.

At 15 years and 6 months old, Marta Kostyuk became the youngest player to win a main draw match at the Australian Open since Martina Hingis in 1996 and the youngest to reach the third round at a major since Mirjana Lučić-Baroni at the 1997 US Open. Kostyuk was the youngest player to qualify for a major main draw since Sesil Karatantcheva at the 2005 Australian Open.

Seeds

Qualifying

Wildcards

Draw

Finals

Top half

Section 1

Section 2

Section 3

Section 4

Bottom half

Section 5

Section 6

Section 7

Section 8

Championship match statistics

References

External links
Draw
 2018 Australian Open – Women's draws and results at the International Tennis Federation

Women's Singles
2018
2018 in Australian women's sport
2018 WTA Tour
2018 in women's tennis